The Municipality of Trnovska Vas is a municipality in northeastern Slovenia. The seat of the municipality is the settlement of Trnovska Vas. The area is part of the traditional region of Styria. It is now included in the Drava Statistical Region.

Settlements
In addition to the namesake town, the municipality also includes the following settlements:
 Biš
 Bišečki Vrh
 Črmlja
 Ločič
 Sovjak
 Trnovski Vrh

References

External links

 Municipality of Trnovska Vas website
 Municipality of Trnovska Vas on Geopedia

Trnovska Vas